The 1998 CONCACAF Champions' Cup was the 34th edition of the annual international club football competition held in the CONCACAF region (North America, Central America and the Caribbean), the CONCACAF Champions' Cup. It determined that year's club champion of football in the CONCACAF region.

The final tournament, held in Washington, D.C., was won by D.C. United, who defeated Deportivo Toluca 1–0 in the final, becoming the first team from the United States to win the tournament.

Qualified Teams

North American zone 
Major League Soccer: D.C. United – 1997 MLS Cup winner Colorado Rapids – 1997 MLS Cup runner-up
Primera División de México: Toluca – 1998 Verano winner Cruz Azul – 1997 Invierno winner  Club León – 1997 Invierno runner-up
Qualified Clubs on bye to quarterfinal round.

Qualifying Playoff

 León advances to the quarterfinals.

Central American zone
Organized by the Central American Football Union.

Group South A

Group South B

Group North A

Group North B

Group I

Group II

Playoff

 Alajuelense advanced to the Final Tournament.

Caribbean zone 
Caribbean Zone: Joe Public F.C.  (invitee)
The Caribbean club championships during that time were only played in November,CONCACAF invited Joe Public of Trinidad and Tobago as Caribbean representative.

Bracket

Quarterfinals

Semifinals

Third place match

Final

Champion

Player awards

Top goalscorer
 Roy Lassiter (D.C. United) – 6 goals

Most Valuable Player
 Roy Lassiter (D.C. United)

Team of the tournament
Goalkeeper 
Scott Garlick, D.C. United
Defenders
Jeff Agoos, D.C. United
Eddie Pope, D.C. United
Salvador Carmona, Toluca
Roberto Medina, Leon
Midfielders
Fabian Estay, Toluca
Marco Etcheverry, D.C. United
Roy Myers, Saprissa
Forwards
Roy Lassiter, D.C. United
Jose Manuel Abundis, Toluca
Nidelson De Mello, Firpo

References

CONCACAF Champions' Cup
c
c
1